Stuart Mill is a hamlet in north western Victoria, Australia.

The town is named after the British philosopher John Stuart Mill.

References

Towns in Victoria (Australia)
Wimmera